Victoria University College (Myanmar) is a private university college in Myanmar. Being the first private university in the country, Victoria University College comprises four campuses - three in Yangon, one in Mandalay.

History
Nay Win Naing, founded the Victoria University College (Myanmar) in 2012. It started as a college which offered  Edexce Business and Technology Education Council Higher National Diplomas and sixth forms subjects. Later in 2014, VUC became an international teaching center of University of Wolverhampton and offer joint Bachelor's degree.

Courses delivery 
Since 2012, Victoria University College has been delivering the below BTEC HND Courses;

 Business (Management/ Marketing/ HR), 
 Computing (Software/ Network/ IT) and 
 Engineering (Civil Engineering, Mechanical Engineering, Electrical & Electronics Engineering).

The University of Wolverhampton has been in partnership with Victoria University College since May 2014, delivering the following courses;

 BEng (Hons) Electronics and Communications Engineering 
 BEng (Hons) Civil  Engineering 
 BA (Hons) Business Management 
 BEng (Hons) Mechatronics 
 BSc (Hons) Computing and Information Technology 
 MSc Programme and Project Management

Sports team - VUC athletics
Victoria University College has been sponsoring a professional Futsal football team under University's name since 2015. Victoria University College Futsal Club is now competing in National's Myanmar Futsal League.

References

Universities and colleges in Myanmar